Sir John Shelley, 6th Baronet (18 December 1771 – 28 March 1852) was an English landowner, Member of Parliament and amateur cricketer.

Career

He was the son of Sir John Shelley, 5th Baronet by Wilhelmina, the daughter of John Newnham of Maresfield Park. He was educated at Winchester College, Eton College (1786–89) and Clare College, Cambridge (1789) and embarked on the Grand Tour in 1789.

Shelley became 6th Baronet in September 1783 on the death of his father and inherited Michelgrove House near Patching, Sussex, which he was obliged to sell for financial reasons when he became of age. He served in the Army as an Ensign in the 2nd Foot Guards in 1790, becoming a lieutenant and captain in 1793 and Aide-de-Camp to the Duke of Sussex. He was also a lieutenant in the Petworth yeomanry in 1797.

He married in 1807 Frances, the daughter and heiress of Thomas Winckley of Brockholes, Lancashire, with whom he had 4 sons and 2 daughters. He inherited Maresfield Park in Sussex in 1814 on the death of his maternal uncle.

He was also a notable breeder of Thoroughbred racehorses including The Derby winners Phantom (1811), Cedric (1824) and Priam (1830).

Cricket career
He was mainly associated with Sussex and was an early member of Marylebone Cricket Club (MCC). He made 10 known appearances in first-class cricket matches from 1792 to 1795.

Family
He died in 1852 and was succeeded by his eldest son John. His third son Adolphus Edward Shelley was the first Auditor-General in Hong Kong. His wife, Frances Winkley, Lady Shelley (1787–1873), was a noted diarist and close friend of the Duke of Wellington.

References

 Shelley genealogy

External links 
 

|-

1771 births
1852 deaths
People educated at Winchester College
People educated at Eton College
Alumni of Clare College, Cambridge
English cricketers
English cricketers of 1787 to 1825
Marylebone Cricket Club cricketers
Brighton cricketers
Members of the Parliament of the United Kingdom for English constituencies
Members of the Parliament of the United Kingdom for constituencies in Cornwall
UK MPs 1806–1807
UK MPs 1812–1818
UK MPs 1818–1820
UK MPs 1820–1826
UK MPs 1826–1830
Owners of Epsom Derby winners
Shelley baronets, of Michelgrove
People from Maresfield